Lee Hanlan (born 6 October 1971) is a former professional rugby league footballer who played in the 1990s.

References

External links
 (archived by web.archive.org) Stats → Past Players → H at hullfc.com
 (archived by web.archive.org) Statistics at hullfc.com (Lee Hanlon)

1971 births
Batley Bulldogs players
Halifax R.L.F.C. players
Hull F.C. players
Hunslet R.L.F.C. players
Ireland national rugby league team players
Living people
Place of birth missing (living people)
Rugby league centres
Rugby league five-eighths
Wakefield Trinity players
York Wasps players